Windlust (meaning a love of wind) is a name given to some windmills in the Netherlands. Mills named Windlust include:-

Windlust, Achthuizen, a tower mill in Achthuizen, South Holland
Windlust, Brouwershaven, a smock mill in Zeeland
Windlust, Burum, a smock mill in Burum, Friesland
De Windlust, Burdaard, a smock mill in Burdaard, Friesland
Windlust, Goudswaard, a tower mill in South Holland
Windlust, Hoek, a tower mill in Zeeland
Windlust, Nederweert, a tower mill in Limburg
Windlust, Nieuw-Beijerland, a tower mill in South Holland
Windlust, Nieuwerkerk aan de IJssel, a tower mill in South Holland
Windlust, Nistelrode, a post mill in North Brabant
Windlust, Noordwolde, a smock mill in Noordwolde, Friesland
Windlust, Nootdorp, a smock mill in South Holland
Windlust, Overschild, a smock mill in Groningen
Windlust, Radewijk, a tower mill in Overijssel
Windlust, Vorstenbosch, a tower post mill in North Brabant
Windlust, Wassenaar, a tower mill in South Holland
Windlust, Wateringen, a tower mill in South Holland
Windlust, Westmaas, a tower mill in South Holland
Windlust, Wolvega, a smock mill in Friesland
Windlust, Zandeweer, a smock mill in Groningen